Harry Frederick Wilcoxon (8 September 1905 – 6 March 1984), known as Henry Wilcoxon, was an actor born in Roseau, Dominica, British West Indies, and who was a leading man in many of Cecil B. DeMille's films, also serving as DeMille's associate producer on his later films.

Early life
Wilcoxon was born on 8 September 1905 in Roseau, Dominica. His father was English-born Robert Stanley 'Tan' Wilcoxon, manager of the Colonial Bank in Jamaica and his mother, Lurline Mignonette Nunes, was a Jamaican amateur theatre actress, descendant of a wealthy Spanish merchant family.

As important in his life as his parents, but closer, was his only sibling, his older brother Robert Owen Wilcoxon, known as 'Owen'. Henry (known then by his born name, Harry) had a difficult childhood. His mother "disappeared suddenly and mysteriously" (presumed she died) when he was about a year old, and his father took him and Owen (aged four) to England with the intention that his own mother Ann would care of them. But, because his mother was too frail to care for the children, they were first sent to a bad foster home, where they became ill from malnutrition and neglect until this was discovered and they were moved on to an orphanage. Harry suffered from rickets, and Owen developed a stutter and had epileptic fits. They were rescued from the orphanage to a new foster home run by the more caring Stewart family, at Springfield House in Acton, London. After several years Harry's father 'Tan', with his new wife Rosamond took the children home with them to Bridgetown, Barbados, where they were educated. Harry was sent to Wolmer's Boys School in Kingston, Jamaica and Harrison College, Barbados. Harry told that at 14 he was 'almost' the underwater swimming champion of Barbados and good enough to become a salvage diver.

Harry and his brother Owen were known as 'Biff' and 'Bang' to friends and family due to fighting skills gained in amateur boxing.

Acting
After completing his education, Wilcoxon was employed by Joseph Rank, the father of J. Arthur Rank, before working for Bond Street tailors Pope and Bradshaw. While working for the tailors, Wilcoxon applied for a visa to work as a chauffeur in the United States, but upon seeing his application refused, turned to boxing and then to acting.

Stage
Harry Wilcoxon's first stage performance was as a supporting actor in an adaptation of the novel The 100th Chance, by Ethel M. Dell, in November 1927 at Blackpool, before he joined the Birmingham Repertory Theatre the next year and toured "for several years" playing "all roles that came his way." Among these roles, he found critical success playing Captain Cook in a production of Rudolph Besier's The Barretts of Wimpole Street at the London Queen's Theatre alongside Gwen Ffrangcon-Davies, Scott Sunderland and Cedric Hardwicke. In June 1932, at the Queen's Theatre, he played Donald Gage alongside Edith Evans as Irela in Sir Barry Jackson's production of Beverley Nichols' novel Evensong.

Early screen work

In 1931, Wilcoxon made his screen debut as "Larry Tindale" in The Perfect Lady, followed by a role opposite Heather Angel in Self Made Lady, alongside Louis Hayward and others. In 1932, he appeared in a remake of the 1929 film The Flying Squad (based on the novel by Edgar Wallace), reprising the role originated by future-Hitchcock regular John Longden. Altogether he made eight films in Britain prior to 1934.

Also in 1933, "while acting on stage in Eight Bells, a talent scout for Paramount Pictures reportedly arranged a screen test which came to the attention of producer-director Cecil B. DeMille in Hollywood." DeMille recalls in his autobiography:

So he was renamed by DeMille for the role of Marc Antony in Cleopatra, and from then on he was Henry Wilcoxon.

Wilcoxon he was next given the lead role of Richard the Lionheart in DeMille's big-budget film The Crusades (1935) opposite Loretta Young. That film, however, was a financial failure, "losing more than $700,000". After the lack of success of The Crusades, Wilcoxon's career stalled; although he featured—and starred—in a number of films, most were "minor B's like The President's Mystery and Prison Nurse for Republic [Pictures]." Wilcoxon himself deemed his worst acting job to be in Mysterious Mr. Moto (1938), in which year he played in If I Were King and featured in Five of a Kind with the Dionne quintuplets.

The war years
In 1941, Wilcoxon appeared as Captain Hardy, alongside Laurence Olivier and Vivien Leigh, in Alexander Korda's Lady Hamilton, during the filming of which:

a wad of flame fell from a torch directly on Olivier's head, setting his wig afire. Wilcoxon, standing right beside him, tried to extinguish the blaze but was unsuccessful. Finally he had to wrench the wig from Olivier's head, but he had both hands badly burned while Olivier had his eyebrows scorched."

When America entered the World War II in December 1941, Wilcoxon enlisted in the United States Coast Guard, supposedly "leaving his home twenty minutes after the announcement that the States had declared war and proceeding to enlist then and there." He served with the Coast Guard until 1946, gaining the rank of lieutenant commander.

During his period of service, he had three films released in 1942, among them Mrs. Miniver, which received considerable public acclaim, as well as six Academy Awards. Wilcoxon, in his role as the vicar, "wrote and re-wrote" the key sermon with director William Wyler "the night before the sequence was to be shot." The speech "made such an impact that it was used in essence by President Roosevelt as a morale builder and part of it was the basis for leaflets printed in various languages and dropped over enemy and occupied territory."

Upon his return from war service, Wilcoxon "picked up his relationship with Cecil B. DeMille" with Unconquered, and after starring as Sir Lancelot in the 1949 musical version of Mark Twain's A Connecticut Yankee in King Arthur's Court (with Bing Crosby in the title role), he featured (with "fifth starring billing") in DeMille's Samson and Delilah (1949). To help pre-sell the film, "DeMille arranged for Wilcoxon to tour the country giving a series of lectures on the film and its research in 41 key cities in the United States and Canada." However, "after the fourteenth city," Wilcoxon collapsed "from a mild bout of pneumonia," (actually tuberculosis), and the tour was continued by "press-agent Richard Condon and Ringling Brothers public relations man Frank Braden" (who also collapsed, in Minneapolis). Condon finished touring by the time of the film's release in October 1949. Wilcoxon, meanwhile, had returned to England under contract to feature in The Miniver Story (1950), a sequel to the multi-Oscar-winning Mrs. Miniver (1942) in which he reprised his role as the vicar.

Later life as producer and TV actor
In the late 1940s, "several young actors and actresses came to Wilcoxon and wife Joan Woodbury and asked them to form a play-reading group", which began to take shape as the 'Wilcoxon Players' in 1951, when the two "transformed their living room into a stage." 'Guest star' performers sometimes appeared in the plays produced by the group, among them Larry Parks and Corinne Calvet, and soon the "Wilcoxon Group Players Annual Nativity Play" was being performed "at the Miles Playhouse in Santa Monica." The group was recognised by the American Cancer Society in 1956 with a Citation of Merit, awarded for donations received by attendees of the groups Easter productions.

Wilcoxon played a "small but important part" in DeMille's 1952 production The Greatest Show on Earth, on which film he also served as associate producer, helping steer the film towards its Academy Award for Best Picture, 1952. He also acted as associate producer on, and acted (as Pentaur, the pharaoh's captain of the guards) in DeMille's remake of his own The Ten Commandments (1956). Wilcoxon was sole producer on the 1958 film The Buccaneer, a remake of DeMille's 1938 effort, which DeMille only "supervised" (due to his declining health) while Anthony Quinn directed.

After DeMille died, Wilcoxon did "considerable work... in pre-production" on "a film based on the life of Lord Baden-Powell, founder of the Boy Scout movement," which DeMille had left unrealised, and was also ultimately abandoned.

After a relatively inactive period "for the next three or four years," Wilcoxon had a "chance meeting with actor Charlton Heston and director Franklin Schaffner at Universal Studios," a meeting which saw him appear in The War Lord (1965), for which he again "went on tour... visiting 21 cities to publicize the picture."

He was credited as co-producer on a "90-minute tribute to Cecil B. DeMille televised by NBC" entitled The World's Greatest Showman: The Legend of Cecil B. DeMille (1963), whose production was hampered by the absence of "some of DeMille's best-remembered films of the 30s and 40s" when rights-holder MCA refused their use. At the opening of the DeMille Theatre in New York, he produced a "two-reel short," that in the estimation of critic Don Miller "was much better than this 90-minute tribute."

In the last two decades of his life, he worked sporadically and accepted minor acting roles in a number of television and film productions. He guest-starred in shows including Daniel Boone, Perry Mason, I Spy, It Takes a Thief, Wild Wild West, Gunsmoke, Cimarron Strip, Cagney & Lacey, The Big Valley, Private Benjamin and Marcus Welby, M. D., as well as in a smaller number of films, including a memorable turn as the golf-obsessed Bishop Pickering in the 1980 comedy Caddyshack. In one scene, he plays golf in the driving rain with groundskeeper Carl, played by actor Bill Murray. It took hours to film the scene, with both actors standing under artificial rain towers. In a 2010 interview, Murray called Wilcoxon “a great pro” who “nailed everything he did.” Murray also said Wilcoxon told him that the book, The Art of Dramatic Writing was an influence in his career.

He has a star on the Hollywood Walk of Fame at 6256 Hollywood Blvd. west of Argyle St., in front of the W Hollywood Hotel & Residences and the Metro B Line Hollywood/Vine station, and across from the Pantages Theater.

Personal life
By loaning money from his early film acting, Wilcoxon assisted his brother Owen to establish himself in 1931 as a partner in the Vale Motor Company in London, and for a short time he showed a personal interest in the development of their sports car, the Vale Special. At that time his girlfriend was a London-based American stage actress Carol Goodner.

English-born actress Heather Angel, whom he had previously acted with in Self Made Lady (1932) when they were both in England, had come out to Hollywood a few months before Wilcoxon and met him again in 1934. They became lifetime friends. She taught him horse-riding, and acted in two more films with him: The Last of the Mohicans (1936) and Lady Hamilton (1941). Heather Angel and her husband Ralph Forbes were both present at Wilcoxon's wedding to Sheila Garrett.

Wilcoxon married a 19-year-old actress Sheila Garrett on 28 June 1936, but they divorced a year later. When they had first met, two years before they were married, she was introduced by her sister Lynn Browning as "Bonnie", but when they got to know each other better he preferred the name Sheila Garrett.

On 17 December 1938 (her 23rd birthday) he married his second wife, actress Joan Woodbury. They had three daughters: Wendy Joan Robert Wilcoxon (1939–2020), Heather Ann Wilcoxon (1947) and Cecilia Dawn "CiCi" Wilcoxon (1950). His second daughter was named after Heather Angel. His youngest daughter was named after Cecil B. DeMille: DeMille said he wanted the child to be called Cecil if it was a boy, but when it turned out to be a girl, DeMille was still insistent, saying "I think Cecilia is a beautiful name! My daughter is named Cecilia."  They divorced in 1969.
 
Wilcoxon was an amateur painter and photographer, whose work was exhibited on at least one occasion in London. He was also "an avid antique collector and accomplished flier."

At his home in Burbank in the summer of 1975 Wilcoxon first met his niece Valerie (1933–2017), the English daughter of his brother Owen with Dorothy Drew (sister of architect Jane Drew). Up until then he did not know that his brother, killed in 1940 during the Dunkirk evacuation, had any children.

Partial filmography

Made in UK:
 The Perfect Lady (1931) as Larry Tindale
 Self Made Lady (1932) as Bert Taverner
 The Flying Squad (1932) as Inspector Bradley
 Taxi to Paradise (1933) as Stephen Randall
 Lord of the Manor (1933) as Jim Bridge
 Princess Charming (1934) as Capt. André Launa
 A Woman Alone (1936) (released in USA as Two Who Dared) as Capt. Nicolai Ilyinski
 Jericho (1937) as Capt. Mack
Made in USA:
 Cleopatra (1934) as Marc Antony
 The Crusades (1935) as King Richard the Lionheart
 The Last of the Mohicans (1936) as Major Heyward
 The President's Mystery (1936) (released in UK as  One for All) as James Blake
 Souls at Sea (1937) as Lieutenant Stanley Tarryton
 Jericho (1937) (also titled Dark Sands) as Capt. Mack
 Prison Nurse (1938) as Dale
 Keep Smiling (1938) as Jonathan Rand
 Mysterious Mr. Moto (1938) as Anton Darvak
 If I Were King (1938) as Captain of the Watch
 Five of a Kind (1938) as Dr. Scott Williams
 Woman Doctor (1939) as Allan Graeme
 The Arizona Wildcat (1939) as Richard Baldwin
 Chasing Danger (1939) as Captain Andre Duvac
 Tarzan Finds a Son! (1939) as Mr. Sande
 Free, Blonde and 21 (1940) as Dr. Hugh Mayberry
 The Crooked Road (1940) as Bob Trent 
 Earthbound (1940) as Dr. Jeffrey Reynolds
 Mystery Sea Raider (1940) as Captain Jimmy Madden
 The Lone Wolf Takes a Chance (1941) as Frank Jordan
 That Hamilton Woman (aka Lady Hamilton) (1941) as Captain Hardy
 Scotland Yard (1941) as Dakin Barrolles
 South of Tahiti (1941) as Captain Larkin
 The Corsican Brothers (1941) as Count Victor Franchi
 The Man Who Wouldn't Die (1942) as Dr. Haggard
 Mrs. Miniver (1942) as Vicar
 Johnny Doughboy (1942) as Oliver Lawrence
 Dragnet (1947) as Inspector Geoffrey James
 Unconquered (1947) as Capt. Steele
 A Connecticut Yankee in King Arthur's Court (1949) as Sir Lancelot
 Samson and Delilah (1949) (also associate producer) as Ahtur
 Sunset Boulevard (1950) as Actor on DeMille's 'Samson & Delilah' Set (uncredited)
 The Miniver Story (1950) as Vicar
 The Greatest Show on Earth (1952) (also associate producer) as FBI Agent Gregory
 Scaramouche (1952) as Chevalier de Chabrillaine
 The Ten Commandments (1956) (also associate producer) as Pentaur
 The Buccaneer (1958) (producer only)
 The War Lord (1965) as Frisian Prince
 The Private Navy of Sgt. O'Farrell (1968) as Rear Admiral Arthur L. Stokes
 Man in the Wilderness (1971) as Indian Chief
 Doomsday Machine (1972) as Dr. Christopher Perry
 Against a Crooked Sky (1975) as Cut Tongue / Narrator
 Won Ton Ton, the Dog Who Saved Hollywood (1976) as Silent Film Director
 Pony Express Rider (1976) as Trevor Kingman
 When Every Day Was the Fourth of July (1978) as Judge Henry J. Wheeler
 F. I. S. T. (1978) as Win Talbot
 The Man with Bogart's Face (1978) as Mr. Chevalier
 Caddyshack (1980) as Bishop Fred Pickering
 Sweet Sixteen (1983) as Greyfeather (final film role)

References and notes

Bibliography

External links

 Henry Wilcoxon obituary in the New York Times 
 Robert Owen Wilcoxon at Dunkirk –  an account of the last day of his life, 29 May 1940, by John Morrison

1905 births
1984 deaths
English male film actors
People educated at Harrison College (Barbados)
Dominica actors
People from Roseau
Dominica emigrants to the United Kingdom
British emigrants to the United States
20th-century English male actors
American male film actors
20th-century American male actors
United States Coast Guard personnel of World War II
United States Coast Guard officers